Rhythms of Zamunda, released as Rhythms of Zamunda (Music Inspired by the Amazon Original Movie: Coming 2 America), is a soundtrack album curated by Sipho Dlamini for the film Coming 2 America. It was released on March 5, 2021, by Def Jam Recordings and Def Jam Africa for Paramount Pictures. The album features Pan-African artists such as Nasty C, Larry Gaaga, Umu Obiligbo, Locko, Tekno, Tellaman, Sha Sha, Oxlade, Alpha P, TMXO, DJ Arafat, Prince Kaybee, Msaki, Tiwa Savage, Th&o., Diamond Platnumz, Morgan Heritage, Toofan, Fally Ipupa, BONJ, Gemini Major, Anatii, De Mthuda, Njelic, and Ricky Tyler, as well as appearances from Ari Lennox.

Background
On February 12, 2021, Def Jam revealed the CEO of Universal Music South Africa, Sipho Dlamini, as the curator and executive producer of Rhythms of Zamunda. The Pan-African project was inspired by the film, with lead single "Black and White" by Nasty C and Ari Lennox. On March 10, 2021, National Public Radio released a Tiny Desk show, titled Coming 2 America, Sounds Of Zamunda: Tiny Desk (Home) Concert, a live performance from Nasty C, Lennox, Locko, Ricky Tyler, Alpha P, Prince Kaybee, Msaki, and Toofan.

The tracklist was revealed through Def Jam's official website on February 12, 2021.

Composition
In February 2021, Sipho Dlamini said, "We wanted to bring our knowledge of the music from the continent that is coming up and affecting the youth globally — it's not just Afrobeats. Much like the movie is about America on one side and Africa, we could draw on the African genres you would expect but you also have R&B, hip-hop, house and so forth. 'Black and White' is a great example. It sounds like it could have been made in a studio in the U.S., and it's a collaboration with an American artist, but Nasty C is as African as it gets."

Accolades

Track listing

Reference

Albums produced by Masterkraft (producer)
2021 soundtrack albums
Def Jam Recordings albums